Larochea scitula is a species of sea snail, a marine gastropod mollusk or micromollusk in the family Larocheidae.

Distribution
This marine species occurs off New Zealand.

References

 Geiger D.L. (2012) Monograph of the little slit shells. Volume 1. Introduction, Scissurellidae. pp. 1-728. Volume 2. Anatomidae, Larocheidae, Depressizonidae, Sutilizonidae, Temnocinclidae. pp. 729–1291. Santa Barbara Museum of Natural History Monographs Number 7

External links
 To Encyclopedia of Life
 To World Register of Marine Species

Larocheidae
Gastropods described in 1993